Saw Sa FRCS MBE (also known as Saw Hsa, Ma Saw Sa, Daw Saw Sa; 1 August 1884 – 28 February 1962) was a Burmese physician, midwife, hospital administrator, Christian missionary, suffragist, and government official. Dr. Saw Sa was the first Burmese woman to earn an advanced medical degree, and the first woman to serve in the upper house of the colonial parliament.

Early life 
Saw Sa was the daughter of Burmese Christian parents. Her father Po Saw was a government official (wundauk) of Prome. She was the first woman to graduate from the Baptist-run Judson College in Rangoon, British Burma. She received a missionary scholarship to attend medical college in Calcutta, where she became the first Burmese woman to earn a medical license, in 1911. She gained further training in public health at the Royal College of Physicians and Surgeons in Dublin, where she was "the first Burmese student to win a fellowship".

Medical career and mission activities 
Saw Sa was said to be the only woman physician in Burma when she returned to Rangoon in 1913. From 1914 to 1921 she was superintendent of the Lady Dufferin Maternity Hospital in Rangoon. Her sister and cousins were among the hospital's nurses. She published a textbook, Midwifery (1921). After 1921, she had a private medical practice in Rangoon, and ran a charity hospital. During World War II, she treated war casualties.

In 1921 Saw Sa traveled in the United States. She attended the Woman's American Baptist Foreign Missionary Society's gathering in Des Moines, Iowa, representing the organization's work in India and Burma. The convention goers gave her a "book shower" of about 800 English-language volumes and magazine subscriptions to carry back to mission school students in Rangoon. She served on the International Missionary Council when it met at Lake Mohonk, New York. She pursued further studies in medicine at Johns Hopkins University. She was said to be the first Burmese woman to "make a trip around the world".

Politics 
Saw Sa served on the executive committee of the All-Burma Baptist Woman's Missionary Society, when it formed in 1926. In 1927, she served on the Burma Local Committee of the seventh congress of the Far Eastern Association Of Tropical Medicine. In 1934, she spoke in favor of married women's suffrage in Burma, at the Women's Freedom League Club in London, and while she was a delegate at meetings about Burma's administrative separation from India under British colonial rule. "We claim wifehood franchise for the wives of all men who vote on other qualifications," she declared, adding "On the principle of equal status with men, we are not at all in favour of having seats reserved for women." In 1937, Saw Sa was elected to the upper house of the Burmese Senate, its first woman legislator.

Dr. Saw Sa received her MBE on 3 June 1935.

Personal life 
Saw Sa died on 28 February 1962; she was 77 (in her 78th year).

References

Bibliography
 

Burmese surgeons
20th-century Burmese physicians
People from Bago Region
Hospital administrators
Burmese women physicians
Burmese Baptists
University of Yangon alumni
Burmese politicians
Women's rights in Myanmar
Women in Myanmar
1884 births
1962 deaths
20th-century surgeons
20th-century Baptists
Members of the Senate of Burma